The Cantata Cycle 1716–1717 (also known as the Concertante Cycle) is a series of cantatas written by Georg Philipp Telemann while he was Frankfurt's Director of Municipal Music. In addition to composing music for civic occasions, he conducted and composed for several churches in the city, including the Katharinenkirche and the Barfüßerkirche where he was Kapellmeister. During his time in Frankfurt (1712–1721), he composed five new year-long cycles of sacred music for the Sundays and holy days of the ecclesiastical calendar. He also completed several cycles which he had begun earlier in Eisenach where he had been the leader of the court singers. After taking up his post in Hamburg in 1721, he continued to supply Frankfurt with cantata cycles—one complete cycle every three years, as part of an arrangement to maintain his citizenship of that city.

Early performances and the texts of the cantatas
The cycle was first performed in 1716/17 simultaneously in Frankfurt and in Eisenach. It was intended to become Telemann's third cycle of cantatas set completely to texts by his old companion Erdmann Neumeister. However, due to his numerous obligations Neumeister was not able to deliver the texts after Pentecost. Therefore Telemann commissioned the young poet and student of theology Gottfried Simonis (b. 1692) to author the missing texts from Trinity Sunday onwards.

When Telemann repeated the cantata cycle in Frankfurt in 1719–1720, Neumeister made a new attempt to deliver the missing texts: he added the texts for the 4th to 6th Sundays after Epiphany (Sundays that did not exist in 1717, as Easter fell early on 28 March), plus the Sundays from Trinity onwards. However, Neumeister again failed to deliver the texts after the 14th Sunday after Trinity, so Telemann again had to improvise: for some of the Sundays he wrote texts of his own, and added two new texts by Gottfried Simonis. Some of the texts however are of yet unknown origin.

It was only in his 1726 printing of the cantata cycle's texts, that Neumeister delivered the complete texts. The new texts however were not set to music by Telemann.

Gottfried Simonis on the other hand also supplemented his cycle with texts for the time from Advent to Pentecost, thus completing a full year's cycle. Telemann also composed these new texts and in 1720/21 performed the cantata cycle, which has come to known as Simonis' Neues Lied (or 2nd Concertante Cycle).

Scores
Between 1712 and Telemann's death in 1767 copyists in Frankfurt produced a large collection of performance materials for his religious cantatas, which are currently preserved in the Frankfurt University Library (formerly City and University Library). There are relatively few of these scores available in modern editions. However, the Frankfurt Telemann Society has begun a project in conjunction with Habsburger Verlag to publish modern editions of the scores, particularly the early Frankfurt cantata cycles. These appear in the Frankfurter Telemann-Ausgaben series.

List of cantatas in the 1716–1717 cycle

Continuation of the 1716–1717 cantata cycle on texts by Gottfried Simonis

Continuation of the cycle in 1719–1720

Continuation in Neumeister's 1726 textbook

Recording
The cantata for the Second Sunday in Lent from this cycle, Ich hatte viel Bekümmernis TWV 1:843 can be heard on:
Telemann: Cantatas – (Veronika Winter, Lena Susanne Norin, Jan Kobow, Ekkehard Abele; Rheinische Kantorei; Das Kleine Konzert; conductor: Hermann Max). CPO 7771952.

Set to a poem by Erdmann Neumeister, Ich hatte viel Bekümmernis tells a story from the Gospel of St.Mark in which a woman asks Jesus to heal her daughter who is possessed by the devil.

References and notes

External links
Robert Poliquin, Université du Québec, Extensive list of Telemann's religious cantatas (in French) including the instruments used in the score. They are indexed by both the title and by the Sunday or holy day for which they were written.

Sacred vocal music by Georg Philipp Telemann
Cantatas